The Indonesian ratsnake (Coelognathus subradiatus) is a species of snake of the family Colubridae.

Geographic range
The snake is found in Indonesia.

References 

Reptiles described in 1837
Reptiles of Indonesia
Colubrids